Simon Paul van Velthooven (born 8 December 1988) is a New Zealand track racing cyclist and America's Cup sailor.

Van Velthooven was born in Palmerston North in 1988. He has two younger sisters; his youngest sister, Emily, works as a journalist for Television New Zealand (TVNZ).

Simon won New Zealand's first sprint cycling medal in the men's keirin at the 2012 Summer Olympics jointly with Teun Mulder after the race officials were unable to separate the two in a photo finish for third place. He has also won multiple World Championship and Commonwealth Games medals and was the 2012 World Cup champion in the 1 km time trial and keirin events In 2014, he won a silver in the 1000 m time trial at the Commonwealth Games.

Van Velthooven joined Team New Zealand in 2015 and was one of the original "cyclors" that helped develop the revolutionary boat and was a huge asset to the team that won the 2017 America's Cup for Team New Zealand.

References

External links 
  (archived in 2013)
 

New Zealand people of Dutch descent
New Zealand track cyclists
Commonwealth Games bronze medallists for New Zealand
Cyclists at the 2010 Commonwealth Games
Living people
Cyclists at the 2012 Summer Olympics
Olympic cyclists of New Zealand
Olympic bronze medalists for New Zealand
Olympic medalists in cycling
Medalists at the 2012 Summer Olympics
Sportspeople from Palmerston North
1988 births
Commonwealth Games medallists in cycling
Team New Zealand sailors
2017 America's Cup sailors
Cyclists at the 2014 Commonwealth Games
New Zealand male cyclists
2021 America's Cup sailors
21st-century New Zealand people
Medallists at the 2010 Commonwealth Games
Medallists at the 2014 Commonwealth Games